The New Cathedral of Coimbra (Portuguese: Sé Nova de Coimbra) or the Cathedral of the Holy name of Jesus is the current bishopric seat of the city of Coimbra, in Portugal. The Cathedral is located near the historical University of Coimbra in the upper part of the town (Alta de Coimbra).

History
The New Cathedral was originally the church of the Jesuit Formation house of Coimbra, established in the city in 1543. In 1759, the Jesuit Order was banned from Portugal by the Marquis of Pombal, Prime Minister of King José I.

In 1772, the bishopric seat was transferred from the old Romanesque Cathedral of the city (now called the Old Cathedral of Coimbra) to the vacant, spacious and more modern Jesuit church.

The church architecture was influential in the Portuguese colonial world. The façade of the former Jesuit church of Salvador, in colonial Brazil (now the Cathedral of Salvador), built in the 17th century, seems inspired by the Jesuit church of Coimbra.

Description
The niches of the façade of the New Cathedral carry statues of four Jesuit saints. The Baroque decoration of the upper part of the façade, finished in the beginning of the 18th century, contrasts with the lower part, which follows a rigid Mannerist style. The church has two bell towers located just behind the main façade and a dome over the crossing.

The interior, covered with barrel vaulting, has one nave with several lateral chapels and a transept with a dome and cupola. Both transept arms and the main chapel of the apse are decorated with huge, magnificent gilt wood altarpieces built between the 17th and 18th centuries which are fine examples of the so-called "national" Portuguese altarpiece style. The lateral chapels of the nave have altarpieces in Mannerist and Baroque styles.

The 17th-century choir stalls of the main chapel were brought from the Old Cathedral, as was the intricate stone baptismal font, carved by Pero and Felipe Henriques in late Gothic-Manueline style in the beginning of the 16th century.

See also
 List of Jesuit sites

References
Portuguese Institute for Architectural Heritage 
General Bureau for National Buildings and Monuments (Portugal)

External links
Page about the Sé Nova

Coimbra New
Roman Catholic churches in Coimbra
Baroque church buildings in Portugal
Jesuit churches in Portugal
Tourist attractions in Coimbra
National monuments in Coimbra District
Churches in Coimbra District